Little Johnny from the Hospitul: Breaks & Instrumentuls Vol.1 is the second and final studio album by American hip hop group Company Flow, released in 1999. The record itself is an instrumental album which differs from the group's previous work. It peaked at number 29 on the UK R&B Albums Chart.

Critical reception
Chris Smith of Stylus Magazine gave the album a favorable review, saying, "this is a fine record, and an absolute must for fans of oddball, rule-breaking hip-hop production." Ron Hart of CMJ New Music Report said, "El Producto and DJ Mr. Len — now the group's sole members — twist up a series of instrumental tracks while maintaining breaks steady enough for rhyming and b-boy poppin' and lockin'." Charles Aaron of Spin called it "the group's most skilled production work yet, layering meticulously warped electro passages and sinister guitar riffs amid vivid, gritty beats."

In 2015, Fact placed it at number 48 on the "100 Best Indie Hip-Hop Records of All Time" list.

Track listing

Charts

References

External links
 

1999 albums
Rawkus Records albums
Company Flow albums
Albums produced by El-P